Punctapinella cosangana is a species of moth of the family Tortricidae. It is found in Ecuador in the provinces of Napo and Zamora-Chinchipe.

References

Moths described in 2004
Euliini